Deia may refer to:

 Deià, a coastal village in Mallorca, Spain
 Deia (moth), a genus of moth
 Deia (newspaper), a Basque newspaper based in Bilbao
 Deia, a village in Frumosu, Romania